is a Japanese actress. She is signed with the Stardust Promotion agency.

Filmography

Dramas
 3 nen B gumi Kinpachi sensei Season 6 (2001)
 Satokibi Batake no Uta (2003)
 Sekai no Chuushin de, Ai wo Sakebu (2004)
 Fight (2005)
 Boku no Aruku Michi (2006)
 Taro & Jiro (2007)
 Sugata Sanshiro (2007)
 Fufudo (2007)
 Arigatou! Champy (2008)
 Beyond the Break (2008), Japanese dubbing
 Bara no nai Hanaya (2008)
 Himitsu (TV Asahi, 2010)
 Yamato Nadeshiko Shichi Henge (TBS, 2010, ep5-6)
 Propose Kyodai (Fuji TV, 2011)
 Suitei Yuuzai  (WOWOW, 2012)
 Soko o Nantoka (BS Premium, 2012)
 Engawa Deka (Tokyo Broadcasting System Television, 2013)
 Tamiou (TV Asahi, 2015)
 Kenji no Honkai (TV Asahi, 2016)
 Sakura no Oyakodon (Tōkai Television Broadcasting, 2017)
 Love or Not (Fuji TV, 2017)
 Confidence Man JP (Fuji TV, 2018), ep2
 Fukushuu Sousa (TV Asahi, 2018)

Movies
 Warau Kaeru (2002)
 Swing Girls (2004) - Kaori Sekiguchi (Trombone)
 Love Letter So-renka (2006)
 Kissho Tennyo (2007)
 Dear Friends (2007)
 Aibo the Movie (2008)
 Drop (2009)
 Railways (2010)
 We Were There: First Love (2012)
 We Were There: True Love (2012)
 Peach Girl (2017)
 Ultraman Geed the Movie (2017) - Airu Higa
 The Grapes of Joy (2021)

Commercials
 Matsumoto Kiyoshi Co., Ltd. (2004)
 Kawai Jyuku (2004)
Final Fantasy Crystal Chronicles: Ring of Fates (2007)
 Mitsubishi Motors (2013)
 Nestle Japan (2014)

Photobook
Motokariya, Wani Bukkusu, 2006,

References

1987 births
Living people
Japanese film actresses
Japanese television actresses
Actresses from Tokyo
Stardust Promotion artists
Asadora lead actors
Nihon University alumni